The 2015–16 season of the Norwegian Premier League, the highest bandy league for men in Norway.

Eighteen games were played, with 2 points given for wins and 1 for draws. Stabæk won the league, whereas no teams were relegated.

League table

References

Seasons in Norwegian bandy
2015 in bandy
2016 in bandy
Band
Band